The Texas Reds Steak and Grape Festival is an annual outdoor event held in Bryan, Texas. This weekend street festival is held each October in downtown Bryan. The festival includes a steak cook-off, wine tasting and live music. Grape stomping and activities for children are featured each year.

History

2020
As a result of the COVID-19 pandemic, and the Bryan City Council recommending further cancellation in 2021, the 14th annual event was deferred to 2022.

2009
The 2009 event was attended by over 20,000 people from 18 different states and four countries. Robert Earl Keen, Jr. and Earl Thomas Conley played at the 2009 event

2008
Jerry Jeff Walker headlined the 2nd Annual event

References

External links
 http://www.texasredsfestival.com

General references

June events
Food and drink festivals in the United States
Festivals in Texas
Tourist attractions in Brazos County, Texas
Bryan, Texas